Duško Savić (born 1 July 1968) is a former Bosnian Serb footballer.

Career
He played with FK Sloboda Uzice before joining Red Star Belgrade with which they won the Yugoslav First League in 1990–91 and 1991–92.

Savić had a spell with Ionikos F.C. in the Greek Super League.

References

External links
 Stats from Yugoslav Leagues at Zerodic.

Living people
Serbs of Bosnia and Herzegovina
Yugoslav footballers
Serbian footballers
Serbian expatriate footballers
Yugoslav First League players
Super League Greece players
Red Star Belgrade footballers
Ionikos F.C. players
Expatriate footballers in Greece
Association football midfielders
1968 births